The  connects Munich with Deggendorf, and is  long. Between the interchange Neufahrn and the interchange Munich Airport it has three lanes, otherwise two with a shoulder. There is a traffic control system in the direction of Deggendorf until right before the exit to the airport.

The A 92 essentially follows the lower Isar so that it passes Freising, Moosburg, Landshut, Dingolfing, Landau, Plattling and Deggendorf.  Currently it is the most important connection between Munich and the East Central European countries like Czech Republic, Slovakia and Hungary. After completion of A 94 (Munich–Passau) a part of the traffic load for eastern Europe will shift towards that Autobahn.

The  stretch of the A 92 between Landshut and Plattling has a very low traffic density. This is also the reason that the A 92 is used in part as a test stretch by the BMW factory in Dingolfing. One notes that among other things the road surface is better in the vicinity of Dingolfing.

History

The first conception of building of an Autobahn along the Isar was at the end of the 1960s. It started with the extension of Bundesstraße 11, and with the building of a bypass for Wallersdorf. Until 1970, a small piece of  length of the autobahn was completed already around Wallersdorf, it was named 5-Minuten-Autobahn.

Originally it was planned to extend the A 92 over its present end in Munich out to the Landshuter Allee, where it would have had a connection to the second Munich ring road A 999. This plan has not been executed.

Rest Areas 

There are no filling stations or rest areas in the conventional sense (i.e. those that have their own exit) on the A 92. As a consequence, smaller gasoline station booths have developed into rest areas at many of the exits.

Exit list 

 

 

 

 
 
 

 Regen
|}

External links 

 A 92 at Autobahn Online 

082
A082